Stenalia jakli is a beetle in the genus Stenalia of the family Mordellidae. It was described in 2006 by Horák on Sumba island in Indonesia. The species' metatibia and elytron are black in colour. The name derived from Stanislav Jákl, an entomologist who worked with Horák.

References

jakli
Beetles described in 2006
Endemic fauna of Indonesia